Nomads: Madagascar is the second season of the Greek reality competition television show Nomads which aired from 11 October 2018 until 23 December 2018 on ANT1.
It takes place in Nosy Be, Madagascar, for 12 weeks. The winner wins €150,000.
It features 20 players divided into two nomad tribes: Crocodiles and Lemurians.
After the fourth week, a new tribe of former eight Survivor players entered the game as a team called Invaders. Stelios Hantapakis was the winner of this season.

Teams   
1) Crocodiles, Color: Blue
2) Lemurians, Color: Red
3) Invaders, Color: Black (Former Survivor Greece Players)

Rules 
The rules of the game for every week:
 Week started with the Territory game. The winning tribe lived on the "Island" for this week. The defeated tribe lived in an unpleasant environment, "Savanna".
Second Day: Immunity Game. Defeated tribe nominated two players for elimination.
Third Day: Captain's Game. Captain of the defeated tribe nominated one player for elimination.
Fourth Day: Duel. At first, one player is saved by winning the duel. Then, the audience chose which player to save by voting live.

In the fourth week, every winning team chose by vote a player to send to the Selected tribe and joined the two captains. At the end of the week, five more players joined the new tribe by public vote.

In the fifth week, a new tribe, the Invaders, entered the game.

 Since episode 17

Season summary

The 20 players were initially divided into two nomad tribes: Crocodiles and Lemurians.

Votes

Voting history

Tribe captains

References 

2018 Greek television seasons